The 27th Actors and Actresses Union Awards were held on 12 March 2018 at the Circo Price in Madrid.

The nominations were announced on 13 February 2018. In addition to the competitive awards,  (CIMA) received the '' award (the trophy was collected by their chairwoman), Esperanza Roy the '' career award and Juan Carlos Corazza the Special Award. Actor Jorge Usón won twice in the film and theatre categories.

Winners and nominees 
The winners and nominees are listed as follows:

Film

Television

Theatre

Newcomers

References 

Actors and Actresses Union Awards
2018 in Madrid
2018 television awards
2018 film awards
2018 theatre awards
March 2018 events in Spain